Guardian Mountain is a  glaciated mountain summit located in the Boundary Ranges of the Coast Mountains, in the U.S. state of Alaska. Guardian Mountain is a nunatak surrounded by the Norris Glacier, on land managed by Tongass National Forest. This peak's local name was published in 1960 by the U.S. Geological Survey.

Climate
Based on the Köppen climate classification, Guardian Mountain is located in a subarctic climate zone, with long, cold, snowy winters, and cool summers. Weather systems coming off the Gulf of Alaska are forced upwards by the Coast Mountains (orographic lift), causing heavy precipitation in the form of rainfall and snowfall. Temperatures can drop below −20 °C with wind chill factors below −30 °C. The month of July offers the most favorable weather to view or climb Guardian Mountain.

See also

Geospatial summary of the High Peaks/Summits of the Juneau Icefield
Geography of Alaska

References

Gallery

External links
 Guardian Mountain weather forecast
 Guardian Mountain Flickr photo
              

Mountains of Alaska
Mountains of Juneau, Alaska
Boundary Ranges
North American 1000 m summits